The women's 200 metre breaststroke competition of the swimming events at the 1999 Pan American Games took place on 3 August at the Pan Am Pool. The last Pan American Games champion was Lisa Flood of Canada.

This race consisted of four lengths of the pool, all in breaststroke.

Results
All times are in minutes and seconds.

Heats

B Final 
The B final was held on August 3.

A Final 
The A final was held on August 3.

References

Swimming at the 1999 Pan American Games
1999 in women's swimming